Gwrych Castle (  meaning "hedged castle") (Originally spelt as 'Gwrŷch') is a Grade I listed 19th-century country house near Abergele in Conwy County Borough, Wales. The castle and 236 acre estate are owned by a charity, and a portion of the land is leased to Natural Resources Wales for a 999-year term.

Foundation of the castle
Gwrych Castle was built between 1810 and 1825 by Lloyd Hesketh Bamford-Hesketh (1787–1861), in memory of his mother Frances Lloyd and her ancestors. It incorporated an earlier house that had been in the ownership of the Lloyds since the late-medieval period. From 1894 until 1924, Winifred, Countess of Dundonald, the Hesketh heiress, owned the estate and it became the residence of the Earls of Dundonald (family name of Cochrane). The countess left the castle in her will to King George V and the then Prince of Wales (who later became Edward VIII). However, the gift was refused and the castle passed to the Venerable Order of Saint John. In 1928, the 12th Earl of Dundonald purchased the castle for £78,000, selling the contents to meet the cost.

Early history
The earliest description of Gwrych (written as 'Y Gwrych') is found in an early 16th century deed, in it it reads in full; 

Indenture of demise, 20 April, 27 Henry VIII (1536), by Owen ap Gruffith ap Jevaun ap Gruffith (Owen son of Gruffydd son of Ieuan son of Gruffydd), to Gruffith ap Jevaun ap Gruffith (Gruffydd son of Ieuan son of Gruffydd), for the term of his life, of two parcels of land, in the town of Abergelle (Abergele), in the comote of Isulat (Isaled hundred), within the lordship of Dembych (Dinbych), the one in a place called 'y gwrych,' between the highway from Abergele to Conwey (Conwy) and the common pasture, &c. and the second in place called 'y morva,' (Y Morfa) next land of the heirs of Roger Mylton, &c.; rent, 2d. to the said Owen and to the king 2s. 9d. 

The Lloyds also shared consanguinity with Llywelyn the Great. Situated within the Gwrych Castle Estate are a pair of Iron Age hillforts, a Roman shrine, lead and silver mines and medieval battle sites; the last of these are recorded on stone tablets at the principal entrance.

The year he completed his work, designs for Gwrych by Charles Busby was exhibited at the 1815 Royal Academy exhibition, London.

Later history

Notable events
According to some articles, Queen Victoria stayed at various times at the castle.

Lemmy, who was the lead singer, bassist and primary songwriter of the rock band Motörhead, mentioned that he lived at the castle in an interview with Classic Rock.

Kindertransport
During the Second World War, as part of the  programme, the Government used the castle to house 200 Jewish refugees; it was run by the Jewish Zionist youth movement . After the war, the castle and estate left the Dundonald family and were opened to the public as a visitor attraction.

Visitor attraction
In 1946, the estate was purchased by Robert Rennie and two years later, it opened as a visitor attraction as "The Showpiece of Wales". It was then sold Leslie Salts and was said to have attracted nearly 10 million visitors. 

It was also used as a training venue for the English World Middleweight boxing champion Randolph Turpin in the early 1950s. In the early 1960s it was an occasional venue for the famous motorcycle Dragon Rally, and in the 1970s it was used as a centre for medieval re-enactments, attracting tourists with such events as jousting and banquets.

Closure and decline
Between 1982 and 1986 the location attracted scooterists from all across Britain, and there are a few accounts of scooterists exhibiting their bikes and scooters. Although many of those who attended were peaceful, some were antisocial. There were many young people who were denied service from the castle bar because of their age, but because there were very few staff, when they turned their backs they would then return to steal kegs from the bar and carry them outside where many would help themselves. It was also a common occurrence for youths to swing from the chandeliers and jump on and break large antique tables. On another occasion someone rode their Lambretta scooter through one of the stained-glass windows. On another occasion a portable toilet was set alight. The police attended the area frequently to keep the peace.

The castle closed to the public in 1987, and it started to decline. It was bought in 1989 by Nick Tavaglione, an American businessman, for £750,000. However, his plans to renovate the building were not carried out. As a result, the castle was extensively looted and vandalised, and became little more than a derelict shell, although it was used in 1996 as the backdrop for Prince Valiant, a film starring Edward Fox, Joanna Lumley and Katherine Heigl.  

In 1994 looters "sold off fittings, including fireplaces and stained glass, and stripped the slates and lead from the roof". Later, vandals continued to create damage, and "battlements were toppled from the towers". Also in 1994, arsonists destroyed power-lines by setting an old caravan alight. Years later, in June 2021, a new transformer and pole were installed after the trust had secured enough funds to pay for it.

During Tavaglione's ownership, historian Mark Baker campaigned for the castle to be brought back to its days of glory—a campaign that he started when he was twelve years old. Baker was instrumental in forming the Gwrych Castle Preservation Trust, dedicated to ensuring the castle's future. The condition of the property was monitored by the Trust, who lobbied Conwy council to compulsorily purchase the property, eventually placing pressure on the American owner, who put it up for sale in March 2006.

City Services Ltd, trading as Clayton Homes and Clayton Hotels, bought the castle in January 2007 for £850,000, after it failed to reach its £1.5m reserve price at the 2 June 2006 auction. On 30 April 2007, Clayton Hotels announced a three-year project, costing £6,000,000, to renovate the castle and convert it into a 90-bedroom 5-star hotel, creating 100 jobs. The project was subject to planning permission, but had the support of the Trust. Clayton Hotels spent about £500,000 on its plans, clearing the site and rebuilding areas.

After Clayton Hotels was placed in administration, new developers obtained fresh planning permission in November 2012 from Conwy County Borough Council for the castle to be converted into a luxury hotel with 75 bedrooms and associated facilities.

Rescue of the castle and estate
On 13 June 2018, Gwrych Castle and its estate was sold to Gwrych Castle Preservation Trust, a registered charity, enabled by a grant from the National Heritage Memorial Fund.

The aims of the Gwrych Castle Preservation Trust are: 'to preserve for the benefit of the people of north Wales and of the nation, the historical, architectural and constructional heritage that may exist in and around Gwrych Castle, Abergele, North Wales in buildings (including any building as defined in Section 336 of the Town & Planning Act 1990) of particular beauty or historical, architectural or constructional interest.' Further aims were also explained in a Welsh article setting out their hopes to promote Welsh-based crafters, artists, musicians, and other creative avenues; "It's clear which path we want to follow - one that supports Welsh culture."

The castle is open to visitors seven days per week from 10am to 5pm for a fee. The attraction does warn that "The main building itself remains a ruin" and cannot be accessed, but adds that "a few rooms and outbuildings" can be visited.  

Due to the high cost of repairs and restoring lost content, the trust relies on volunteers or/and philanthropists who can contribute their time, experiences, knowledge and skills. 

In August 2020 it was rumoured that ITV had chosen the castle for the filming of the 20th series of I'm a Celebrity...Get Me Out of Here! after the COVID-19 pandemic meant that the usual Australian location was no longer usable. This was confirmed on 27 August after Gwrych publicly confirmed this on their social media sites. Giovanna Fletcher was crowned the first-ever Queen of the Castle at the end of the series.

Due to the ongoing COVID-19 pandemic and restrictions on filming in Australia, in August 2021 ITV confirmed that I'm a Celebrity...Get Me Out of Here! would be returning to Gwrych for the second time, ensuring that further funds would help restore the castle.

Views
From the castle the views are far reaching; the Irish Sea to the north, the Little Orme and Great Ormes near Llandudno to the west, to the east the hill where Castell Cawr is located, Rhyl and Prestatyn, and on good days Liverpool.

Local folklore
According to a few articles from 1913, on the main road leading to Colwyn Bay near Gwrych Castle, a person claimed that he saw a 'headless monster' in a field over a hedge. Someone else claimed they heard a screech on the same road, but both the headless creature and the screech were concluded to be the combination of a white sheep that looked headless due to its black head blending with the shadows of the hedges along with the accumulation of the morning mist and a broken tree-branch being blown by the wind. This heightened fear caused many people to avoid that road completely, walking miles longer or taking a train instead. Men also took up arms, purchasing revolvers to protect themselves on their way to work.

In the media

Television
Michael Portillo visited Gwrych Castle and met Mark Baker during series 9 episode 14 "Liverpool to Dolgarrog" of BBC's Great British Railway Journeys, first broadcast on 18 January 2018 and featured in BBC One Wales' Hidden Wales episode 1 (2018) presented by Will Millard.

Gwrych Castle was featured in an episode of TV series Abandoned Engineering.

In February 2020, Gwrych was briefly shown on S4C's subsidiary Hansh, where a Welsh artist and researcher for Gwrych Castle Preservation Trust, Rhŷn Williams, spoke about mental health and using his art as therapy to cope. The location was used to show the importance of keeping culture alive. 

In November 2020, History Hit host Dan Snow interviewed Mark Baker, who has dedicated his working life to saving the castle.

I'm a Celebrity...
In late 2020, Gwrych Castle was used as the location of the 20th series of ITV's I'm a Celebrity...Get Me Out of Here!. Due to the COVID-19 pandemic, filming in Australia, the usual location for the series, was not possible. Subsequently, in May 2021, with their involvement at the castle, Mark Busk-Cowley, Roy Callow, Steve Kruger, Andy Milligan, James Tinsley and Mathieu Weekes won BAFTA awards for their contribution on the series.

In November 2021, ITV's I'm a Celebrity.. returned at the castle; but during the first week of shooting, Storm Arwen damaged parts of the production facilities at Manorafon Farm Park, 1 km (0.6 miles) east of the castle. As a consequence, the show temporarily ceased filming and producers took the contestants off-set until filming could resume. The castle, however, was unaffected by the winds due to prior knowledge of Lloyd Hesketh Bamford-Hesketh who used Cefn yr Ogof's hill as a wind barrier against the north-westerly winds from the Irish Sea.

Films
 Holiday on the Buses (1973)
 Prince Valiant (1997)
 Dragon Crusaders (2011)
 Saint Dracula 3D (2012)

Photography
 TIM WALKER: SHOOT FOR THE MOON. By Tim Walker, published by Thames & Hudson, London (2019). This book highlights work done for Vogue, Tim Walker chose Gwrych as one of his scenes to work from.
 MEN’S FALL-WINTER 2021 CAMPAIGN. In Summer of 2021, through Louis Vuitton; Tim Walker photographed Virgil Abloh's line of clothing by using Gwrych Castle as the backdrop.

Literature
Gwrych Castle: A Pictorial History by Mark Baker  (2000)
The rise and fall of Gwrych Castle, Abergele, North Wales: Including Winifred, Countess of Dundonald: a biography. (2003) by Mark Baker.
Myths and Legends of the Gwrych Castle Estate: An Archaeological, Historical and Oral History (2006) by Mark Baker.

The Gwrych Castle Trust Archive and the National Library of Wales hold materials relating to Gwrych, including original plans and designs for the stained-glass windows.

Video games
 In November 2021, in partnership between ITV's I'm a Celebrity...Get Me Out of Here! and John Lewis & Partners, the castle and the show's celebrity trials were made into a downloadable asset to play within the Fortnite franchise.

References

External links

Gwrych Castle
Gwrych Castle: The astonishing fantasy castle saved by the dreams and bravery of a 12-year-old boy Country Life article 

Llanddulas and Rhyd-y-Foel
Castles in Conwy County Borough
Grade I listed buildings in Conwy County Borough
Registered historic parks and gardens in Conwy County Borough
Country houses in Wales
Folly buildings in Wales
Mock castles in Wales
Thomas Rickman buildings
I'm a Celebrity...Get Me Out of Here! (British TV series)